Remember Everyone Deployed (also known as RED or Red Friday) is a concept of honoring United States service members currently deployed overseas. 

Remember Everyone Deployed is believed to have originated in April 2015 with students at Mansfield University. They wore clothing with the color red on Fridays as a way to letting service members known they are remembered and appreciated. 

The term was used by Brennan Poole on his vehicle during a 2000 NASCAR Camping World Truck Series race.

References 

Unofficial observances
Friday observances